ToonHeads is an American animation anthology series consisting of Hanna-Barbera, Metro-Goldwyn-Mayer, Warner Bros., and Popeye cartoon shorts, with background information and trivia, prominently about animators and voice actors of the shorts. ToonHeads was originally broadcast on Cartoon Network from October 2, 1992, until November 23, 2003.

The series was first announced on the Cartoon Network Special "Droopy's Guide to the Cartoon Network" as part of a promotion advertising the various blocks that would appear on the channel and what order they would be shown in. This special was the very first broadcast on the Cartoon Network's launch on October 1, 1992, and was re-aired throughout October 1992. The series includes more than 102 episodes (many undocumented), when including five specials (four one-hour specials and one half-hour special, two of which ("The Best of the Worst Cartoons Ever" and "The Twelve Missing Hares") were never aired).

Format
Early seasons feature an announcer stating each episode's theme and three cartoons to be showcased. Then the show underwent two format changes. The first happened in late 1995 when Don Kennedy was added as the narrator and would tell the history and facts of each cartoon shown (Don Kennedy would also have narration duties on The Tex Avery Show that same year).

The second format change came in 1998 when George A. Klein took over as producer and writer of the show. He wanted the show to be a "Ken Burns" type of weekly documentary on specific cartoon history. Creating specific "themed" episodes utilizing the Warner Bros. cartoons. Three basic concepts used for these episodes are directors (e.g. Chuck Jones and Friz Freleng), characters (e.g. "Evolution of Tweety" and "The Year Elmer Fudd Got Fat"), and themes. Episodes include themes like cartoons that lampooned Hollywood celebrities and movies; cartoons where the humor comes from a character trying to get some sleep and being interrupted; cartoons that make fun of sports; obscure and rare works from Warner Bros.; and a look at the allegations of plagiarism between "The Cat Concerto" and "Rhapsody Rabbit". Trivia questions were also added about the related cartoons used in each episode's theme. From 1998 to 2003 Leslie Fram did the narration for each episode's final tracks and George A. Klein narrated the rough-cut scratch tracks.

Episodes
ToonHeads is notable for showing cartoons that were rarely seen on television, such as on "The Wartime Cartoons" special, "The Lost Cartoons" special, and one series of episodes in January 1996 featuring the long-unseen Nudnik shorts There was also a special that aired on October 20, 1996, titled A Night of Independent Animation, which featured independent student films, such as Another Bad Day for Philip Jenkins by Mo Willems, and The Wire by Aaron Augenblick.

As of August 2022, the two unaired episodes "The Best of the Worst Cartoons Ever" and "The Twelve Missing Hares" have been found. These episodes were preserved on tape by episode writer Jerry Beck and transferred through media loan by Jerico Dvorak who made them available.

Season 1 (1992–95)

Season 2 (1996)

Season 3 (1998–99)

Season 4 (1999)

Season 5 (1999–2001)

Season 6 (2001)

Season 7 (2002)

Season 8 (2003)

References

External links
 
  on Internet Archive

1990s American animated television series
2000s American animated television series
1990s American anthology television series
2000s American anthology television series
1992 American television series debuts
2003 American television series endings
Cartoon Network original programming
American children's animated anthology television series
Animation fandom
English-language television shows